The Qatar Cup is organised by the International Weightlifting Federation (IWF), and Qatar Weightlifting Federation.

Edition

References

International weightlifting competitions hosted by Qatar